Lésigny is the name of two communes in France:

 Lésigny, Seine-et-Marne, Île-de-France
 Lésigny, Vienne, Poitou-Charentes